Fintan J. Aylward (March 11, 1928 – June 29, 2021) was a politician in Newfoundland and Labrador. He represented Placentia East in the Newfoundland House of Assembly from 1972 to 1975. He was a lawyer and judge. Aylward died in St. John's in 2021 at the age of 93.

References

1928 births
2021 deaths
Canadian judges
People from St. Lawrence, Newfoundland and Labrador
Progressive Conservative Party of Newfoundland and Labrador MHAs